Peter Bullions (December 1791 – February 20, 1864) was a Scottish-born American Presbyterian minister and grammarian. He was the author of several textbooks of English, Latin and Greek grammar as well as commentaries on Julius Caesar's Commentarii de Bello Gallico.

Life
Bullions was born in December 1791 in Perthshire, Scotland. He emigrated to the United States, where he became a Presbyterian minister.

Bullions revised The Principles of English Grammar by William Lennie, another Scottish grammarian, in the 1830s. In the 1840s and 1850s, he wrote his own textbooks on English, Latin and Greek grammar. He also authored commentaries on Julius Caesar's Commentarii de Bello Gallico.

Bullions died on February 20, 1864, in Troy, Vermont. Two years later, American grammarian Asahel C. Kendrick revised his Principles of Greek Grammar.

Selected works

References

External links
Works by Peter Bullions on the Internet Archive

1791 births
1864 deaths
People from Perthshire
Scottish emigrants to the United States
American Presbyterian ministers
Scottish grammarians
American grammarians
American classical scholars
19th-century American clergy